Siovi Shuatak is a populated place situated in Pima County, Arizona, United States. The location has been known by numerous names over the years: Cochiba Well, Cochibo, Cochibo Well, Cochivo, Con Quien, Coons Can Well, Manuels Well, and Sweetwater. Its name officially became Siovi Shuatak, which is O'odham for "sweet water".

References

Populated places in Pima County, Arizona